Betws Garmon is a community and small hamlet outside Waunfawr and near Beddgelert in Gwynedd, Wales.  It has a population of 249.

The summit of Snowdon lies within the community boundaries. Bryn Gloch has the newly reopened narrow gauge Welsh Highland Railway passing alongside it.
The hamlet of Rhyd-Ddu is in the community.

Over the road from Bryn Gloch there is a parish church. Along the mountain   extensive slate workings can be seen.

Betws Garmon also has a park near it. Near the station there is a road which leads to Rhosgadfan. Up that road there is a footpath that leads to Y Fron. A river that flows through the hamlet is called Afon Gwyrfai.

There was a folk tale concerning the family of Pellings, who lived at Betws Garmon until the 19th century. It was said that they were descended from a man and a fairy named Penelope. Penelope lived happily with her human husband until she was accidentally touched with a piece of iron, whereupon she disappeared forever.

Etymology 
The first part of the name of the village comes from the Middle English word bedhus, meaning "prayer house", which became betws in Welsh.

Demographics
Betws Garmon's population was 249, according to the 2011 census; a 15.28% increase since the 216 people noted in 2001.

The 2011 census showed 54.8% of the population could speak Welsh, a rise from 45.0% in 2001.

Nearly half of the population was born in England.

References

External links 

www.geograph.co.uk : photos of Betws Garmon and surrounding area